Tara Kelly (born 21 June 1985) is an Australian former representative lightweight rower. She was a national champion and 2007 world champion.

Club and state rowing
Kelly was educated at St Joseph's Queenland where she took up rowing. She won the national Schoolgirl Scull title at the Australian Rowing Championships in 2001.

Kelly's senior rowing was done from the Tweed Heads Rowing Club.

In 2007, Kelly rowed in the Queensland state representative crew contesting the Victoria Cup in the women's lightweight quad scull at the Interstate Regatta within the Australian Rowing Championships. In Tweed Heads Rowing Club colours she also contested national titles at the Australian Rowing Championships. She raced in the lightweight double scull in 2006; in the lightweight quad scull in 2007; and she contested the lightweight single scull event in 2006 winning that year's Australian title.

International representative rowing
Kelly first represented Australia at the 2003 Junior World Rowing Championships in Athens. In a double scull with Sally Kehoe she won gold and a junior world title. In 2004 and 2005 she represented at the World Rowing U23 Championships in the double scull. She placed third with Susanne Brown in Poznan in 2004 and second with Jessica Huston in Amsterdam in 2005.

Kelly was elevated to the senior Australian women's lightweight quad for the 2007 World Rowing Championships in Munich. Seated at three with Bronwen Watson, Miranda Bennett, and Alice McNamara they won their heat and lead the final from the 500 m mark to claim the gold and Kelly's first & only senior World Championship title.

References 

 

1985 births
Living people
Australian female rowers
World Rowing Championships medalists for Australia
21st-century Australian women